Finnur Ingólfsson (born 8 August 1954) is an Icelandic politician and former government minister. He was the governor of Central Bank of Iceland from 2000 to 2002.

References

External links 
 Biography of Finnur Ingólfsson on the parliament website

1954 births
Governors of the Central Bank of Iceland
Finnur Ingolfsson
Living people
Place of birth missing (living people)